Spongodiscidae is a family of radiolarians in the order Spumellaria. According to the original description by Ernst Haeckel, members of the family have a flat discoidal shell, in which a simple spherical central chamber is surrounded by an irregular spongy framework.

References

External links

Polycystines
Radiolarian families